Environmental subsystems are central components of operating systems of the Windows NT type.  They allow the operating system to run software developed for the platform in question.  For example, Windows NT 4.0 has four environmental subsystems, viz Win32, DOS or Win16, OS/2, and POSIX, the latter of which is a Unix standard.  The latter resides primarily in the Dynamic Link Library posix.dll.  

The environmental subsystems are one part of the strategy Microsoft developed for making the Windows NT stream of operating systems a hub for multi-platform computing   Others include four Hardware Abstraction layers, one for Intel processors, three for RISC processors (DEC Alpha, PowerPC, Mips), and a driver for the HPFS, the standard for OS/2. Since Windows 2000, the FAT32 file system first introduced with Windows 95 has also been present, with HPFS deprecated then being omitted in later systems.  A third-party driver for FAT32 can be used on the earlier NT operating systems.  Therefore, Windows NT as of version 4.0  had a default of four file systems (NTFS, HPFS, FAT12, and FAT16), and installations of the system with a driver allowing access to a fifth FAT32) are very common, and tools allowing access to Unix file systems are also in existence.  Interoperability with Novell Netware is generally implemented at the applications and systems programming level rather than at the kernel and data link layer and therefore further from the physical hardware.

References

Windows NT architecture